Transfixiation is the fourth studio album by the American noise rock band A Place to Bury Strangers, released February 17, 2015, by Dead Oceans.

Singles and music videos 
The album was preceded by the singles "Straight", released November 19, 2014, and "We've Come So Far", released January 14, 2015. Both songs received music videos: the video for "Straight" was released December 6, 2014, directed by Brook Linder, and features a TV station's signal being hijacked in order to display "a nightmare of analog psychedelia and haunted pop culture imagery", inspired by the Max Headroom broadcast signal intrusion of 1987. The "We've Come So Far" video was released February 19, 2015, and contains footage of the last show at Williamsburg, Brooklyn concert venue Death By Audio which was directed by the venue's co-founder Matt Conboy.

Track listing

Personnel

Musicians 
 Oliver Ackermann – vocals, guitar, bass
 Dion Lunadon – bass, guitar, backing vocals (8)
 Robi Gonzalez – drums
 Emil Nikolaisen – guitar (5, 7)
 Emilie Lium Vordal – vocals (5, 7)

Technical 
 A Place to Bury Strangers – producers, recording engineers
 Emil Nikolaisen – producer (5, 7)
 Oliver Ackermann – mastering engineer
 Miles Johnson – artwork, design

References 

2015 albums
A Place to Bury Strangers albums
Dead Oceans albums